Broadwell is a village in Logan County, Illinois, United States. The population was 136 at the 2020 census.

Geography
Broadwell is located in southwestern Logan County. Interstate 55 passes through the western side of the village, with access from Exit 119.

History 
 
The village of Broadwell was platted in 1856 by William Broadwell and Jacob Eisiminger, which occurred in conjunction with the construction of the railroad linking Chicago and Springfield.

Prior to the plat of the village, there was an inn three-quarters of a mile east of the present site, called "Tantivy" or "TAN-TI-VY". The name apparently derives from an old English hunting cry. Tantivy Lodge was in existence from about 1840 through the early 1950s; tradition states that Abraham Lincoln stopped there while traveling from Springfield to the Logan County courthouse at Postville (today a part of the newer city of Lincoln, Illinois) while Lincoln rode the judicial circuit as a lawyer. It is recorded (with greater certainty) that the (later) central Illinois cattle and land baron, John Dean Gillett, proposed marriage to his future wife, Lemira Parke, at the Tantivy cabin c. 1840. It is likely that Tantivy was relocated by about one-eighth of a mile (from east to west) at least once during its existence.

When Jacob Eisiminger was offered the honor of having the village named after him, he declined, stating that the new village would be handicapped with such an unusual name; accordingly, it was named Broadwell. William Broadwell (of Springfield) owned the original land, but had very little further connection with the village, and he later moved to Kansas; the Eisiminger family, however, were long-time merchants, postmasters and schoolteachers in the village. Leola Eisiminger, the last member of the family bearing this name, died on August 16, 2005.

Broadwell became a shipping point for hogs, corn, wheat and later soybeans. The village and township has never known any great period of economic boom or bust.  The surrounding Broadwell Township features some of the finest productive agricultural soils in North America.

The village was located directly on historic U.S. Route 66, from 1926 to 1978; today the limited-access Interstate 55 is located on the western edge of the village. There is a full interstate exit for the village and township. The former northbound lane of U.S. Route 66 remains intact, and it still serves the village as a major local road and tourist magnet.

Broadwell featured the well-known "Pig Hip" Restaurant, operated by Ernest L. ("Ernie") Edwards and family from 1937 through 1991. Edwards recently received the citation for "The BEST U.S. Route 66 attraction where the ORIGINAL GUY is still there". Until recently, the Pig Hip building was still open as a museum of Route 66 memorabilia, with Ernie Edwards (born August 5, 1917) as the host. The restaurant/museum and most of its contents were destroyed by fire on March 5, 2007. Ernie operated a small museum from his adjacent residence until late 2010, and he died in nearby Lincoln on April 11, 2012. He retained his wits and memory to the very end of life, and was a fount of Route 66 stories and information. On June 9, 1990, Ernie became an inaugural inductee into the Route 66 Hall of Fame of Illinois.

A bronze and stone memorial dedicated to the Pig Hip Restaurant and to U.S. Route 66 was unveiled by Ernie Edwards on August 5, 2007. The large boulder and bronze marker were presented to Ernie by his family, friends, and neighbors on the occasion of his 90th birthday.

The village and township of Broadwell sent two of its native sons to the Illinois General Assembly during the late twentieth century. John R. ("Jack") Lauer served as state representative from 1973 to 1978, and Robert F. ("Bob") Olson served as state representative from 1986 to 1994. Both men farmed locally for many years.

Demographics

Per the 2010 United States Census, Broadwell had 145 people.  This includes 143 non-Hispanics White, 1 Black & 1 Hispanic or Latino.

There were 66 households, out of which 16.7% had children under the age of 18 living with them, 57.6% were married couples living together, 1 household had a female householder with children & no husband present, and 36.4% were non-families. 25.8% of all households were made up of individuals, and 24.2% had someone who was 65 years of age or older.

The population was spread out, with 84.8% over the age of 18 and 15.2% who were 65 years of age or older. The median age was 47.3 years. The gender ratio was 50.3% male & 49.7% female.  Among 66 occupied households, 65.2% were owner-occupied & 34.8% were renter-occupied.

As of the census of 2000, there were 169 people, 70 households, and 46 families residing in the village. The racial makeup of the village was 100.00% White.

There were 70 households, out of which 27.1% had children under the age of 18 living with them, 58.6% were married couples living together, 7.1% had a female householder with no husband present, and 32.9% were non-families. 25.7% of all households were made up of individuals, and 7.1% had someone living alone who was 65 years of age or older. The average household size was 2.41 and the average family size was 2.94.

In the village, the population was spread out, with 20.7% under the age of 18, 8.9% from 18 to 24, 32.5% from 25 to 44, 24.9% from 45 to 64, and 13.0% who were 65 years of age or older. The median age was 38 years. For every 100 females, there were 96.5 males. For every 100 females age 18 and over, there were 97.1 males.

The median income for a household in the village was $40,000, and the median income for a family was $40,000. Males had a median income of $40,469 versus $23,750 for females. The per capita income for the village was $19,911. About 8.3% of families and 8.5% of the population were below the poverty line, including 18.4% of those under the age of eighteen and 11.8% of those 65 or over.

References

External links
History of Broadwell, Il.

Villages in Logan County, Illinois
Villages in Illinois
Populated places established in 1856